The 141st Regiment Illinois Volunteer Infantry was an infantry regiment that served in the Union Army during the American Civil War. It was among scores of regiments that were raised in the summer of 1864 as Hundred Days Men, an effort to augment existing manpower for an all-out push to end the war within 100 days.

Service
The 141st Illinois Infantry was organized at Elgin, Illinois, and mustered into Federal service on June 16, 1864, for a one-hundred-day enlistment. The 141st served in garrisons in the Columbus, Kentucky, area.

The regiment was mustered out of service on October 27, 1864.

Total strength and casualties
The regiment suffered a loss 30 enlisted to disease, but lost no men otherwise.

Commanders
Colonel Stephen Bronson -  mustered out with the regiment.

See also
List of Illinois Civil War Units
Illinois in the American Civil War

Notes

References
The Civil War Archive
History - Illinois Infantry

Units and formations of the Union Army from Illinois
Military units and formations established in 1864
1864 establishments in Illinois
Military units and formations disestablished in 1864